William Hugh Edwards (born 29 July 1933) is a Western Australian former journalist, author and marine photographer who has written numerous books on maritime, local and natural history and diving.

Shipwrecks
Edwards played a major part in the exploration of Dutch East India Company shipwrecks of the 17th and 18th centuries on the Western Australia coast. He was recognised as primary discoverer of the Batavia and Zeewyk.

Books and awards
His book Islands of Angry Ghosts on his expedition to the site of Batavia, lost in the Abrolhos Islands in 1629, won the Sir Thomas White Memorial Prize for the best book written by an Australian in 1966. It covers the loss of the Dutch East Indiaman, the mutiny and massacre on the island, and the retributions.

Wreck on the Half Moon Reef is another of Edwards' books, on the loss of Zeewyk in 1727.  Recent titles include Shark – The Shadow Below, and Port of Pearls (on the north-west town of Broome and its pearling industry). Edwards' autobiography Dead Men's Silver detailing 60 years of diving, shipwreck discovery and salvage, was published in 2011. He lives in Perth, Western Australia and was awarded the Medal of the Order of Australia on 8 June 2009.

Works

References

External links
 

Living people
Photographers from Western Australia
Historians from Western Australia
Writers from Perth, Western Australia
Historians of the Dutch East India Company
1933 births